Anna Rita Marchesini (November 19, 1953 – July 30, 2016) was an Italian actress, voice actress, comedian, impressionist and writer.

Together with fellow actors Tullio Solenghi and Massimo Lopez, she has been a member of the comic group known as Il Trio (The Trio).

Biography
Marchesini graduated in Psychology at the Sapienza University of Rome in 1975 and attended, from the following year, the Silvio D'Amico National Academy of Dramatic Arts. She began her career on stage and as a voice actress: in 1982, during a dubbing session, she met Massimo Lopez and, together with Tullio Solenghi, they founded Il Trio, which debuts on Rai Radio 2 with the Hellzapoppin radio show.

Following the great success of Hellzapoppin, the Trio participated in various television programs like Domenica in and the 1986 edition of Fantastico and took part to the Sanremo Music Festival editions of 1986, 1987 and 1989.

In 1990, the Trio reaches the peak of success with the parody of Alessandro Manzoni's The Betrothed, which was broadcast on Rai 1 in 5 episodes. Together with Solenghi and Lopez, Marchesini brought on stage two theatrical shows: Allacciare le cinture di sicurezza (Fasten your seat belts) in 1987 and In principio era il trio (In the Beginning, there was the Trio) in 1990.

The Trio dissolved in 1994, due to the will of all three actors to work as soloists, but reunited for one last time in 2008 to celebrate its 25th anniversary with the TV-program Non esiste più la mezza stagione.

As a soloist, Marchesini took part to several TV-programs, giving impressions of many famous characters, such as Gina Lollobrigida and Rita Levi-Montalcini.

Since 2000, Marchesini began as well her writing career with several collections of stories and short comic monologues, like ...che siccome che sono cecata (...since I am blind, 2000), quoting one of her most famous catchphrases, Il terrazzino dei gerani timidi (The terrace of shy geraniums, 2011) and Moscerine (Gnats, 2013).

Her most important work as a voice actress in the one of providing the Italian voice of Yzma in The Emperor's New Groove.

Personal life
Marchesini was married to actor Paki Valente from 1991 until their divorce in 2001. Together, they had one daughter, Virginia.

Death
After having suffered for many years of a rheumatoid arthritis, Marchesini died in her home in Orvieto on July 30, 2016, at the age of 62. Marchesini has been cremated and buried in the family chapel in the Orvieto cemetery.

Television

With the Trio
 Domenica in (1985–1986)
 Fantastico (1986–1987)
 Sanremo Music Festival 1986 (1986)
 Sanremo Music Festival 1987 (1987)
 Sanremo Music Festival 1989 (1989)
 Non esiste più la mezza stagione (2008)

As soloist
 Quelli che... il Calcio (1997–2001)
 Sanremo Music Festival 1999 (1999)
 Sanremo Music Festival 2002 (2002)

References

External links
 
 

1953 births
2016 deaths
People from Orvieto
Italian film actresses
Italian voice actresses
Italian stage actresses
Italian television actresses
Italian television personalities
Italian women comedians
Italian impressionists (entertainers)
20th-century Italian actresses
21st-century Italian actresses
20th-century Italian comedians
21st-century Italian comedians
Accademia Nazionale di Arte Drammatica Silvio D'Amico alumni
Sapienza University of Rome alumni
Disease-related deaths in Umbria
Deaths from arthritis
Ciak d'oro winners